Steven Lowell Parode (born 1964) is a rear admiral in the United States Navy. He last served Director of the Warfare Integration Directorate (N2/N6F) in the Office of the Chief of Naval Operations, being succeeded by Kathleen M. Creighton in 2020. Parode previously served as Director of Intelligence and Senior Intelligence Officer, Principal Intelligence Advisor to the Commander of United States Strategic Command.

Career
Parode was commissioned in 1986. He served aboard the  during the Gulf War and with the United States Sixth Fleet during the Iraq War, as well as while taking part in Joint Task Force Aztec Silence. Other assignments Parode has received include serving as a task force commander with the United States Tenth Fleet.  Rear Admiral Parode is believed to be the last active duty officer in the United States Navy to have served aboard a battleship making him the last battleship admiral.

Education
University of California, Los Angeles - B.A. in History (Soviet Studies), 1986
Georgetown University – M.A. in National Security Studies (American Government)
Naval War College – Distinguished Graduate

References

1964 births
Living people
Place of birth missing (living people)
People from Washington, D.C.
University of California, Los Angeles alumni
Georgetown University alumni
Naval War College alumni
United States Navy personnel of the Gulf War
United States Navy personnel of the Iraq War
Recipients of the Legion of Merit
Recipients of the Defense Superior Service Medal
United States Navy rear admirals (upper half)